The Federação Bahiana de Futebol (English: Football Association of Bahia state) was founded on September 14, 1913, and it manages all the official football tournaments within the state of Bahia, which are the Campeonato Baiano and the Campeonato Baiano lower levels, and represents the clubs at the Brazilian Football Confederation (CBF). Its headquarters are located in the Edifício Palácio dos Esportes, Praça Castro Alves, Salvador.

Current clubs in Brasileirão
As of 2022 season. Common team names are noted in bold.

References

Bahiana
Football in Bahia
Sports organizations established in 1913
1913 establishments in Brazil